Shkumbin is an Albanian given name for males. It derives from Shkumbin, a river in central Albania, flowing into the Adriatic Sea, which is considered the dividing line for the two dialects of the Albanian language: Tosk (to the south) and Gheg (to the north).

Notable people bearing this name include:
 Shkumbin Arsllani (born 1980), Albanian footballer from North Macedonia

References

Albanian masculine given names